Smirnoff is a Germanization of the Russian-language surname Smirnov. Notable people with the surname include:

 Alexandra Smirnoff (1838–1913), Finnish scientist, pomologist and writer
 Alexis Smirnoff, Canadian professional wrestler
 Boris Smirnoff (1903–2007), Franco-Russian cubist, avantgardist and analytical art painter
 Karin Smirnoff (1880–1973), Finnish-Swedish writer
 Karin Smirnoff (writer) (born 1963), Swedish writer
 Karina Smirnoff, Ukrainian-American dancer best known for ''Dancing with the Stars'
 Natalia Smirnoff, Argentine film director and screenwriter
 Veronica Smirnoff, Russian-born British artist
 Wladimir Smirnoff (1917–2000), Soviet-born entomologist who worked in French Morocco and Canada
 Yakov Smirnoff, Russian-American comedian

See also
 
 Smirnoff (disambiguation)

Russian-language surnames